The Southern Ridges comprise  of trails connecting three parks along the southern ridge of Singapore. Some of the attractions along these trails include its greenery and the connecting bridges. This project linked up the parks between the Kent Ridge Park and HarbourFront. The idea to link these parks was coined in 2002 by Urban Redevelopment Authority (URA) and it took 2 years to complete and cost S$25.5 million.

Parks 

There are 3 parks that are connected to each other: Mount Faber, Telok Blangah Hill Park and the Kent Ridge Park.

Mount Faber Park 
 
Mount Faber Park is one of the oldest parks in Singapore and a popular tourist destination. The park is connected to Telok Blangah Hill Park by Henderson Waves bridge. The park consists of such locations as the Marina Deck, Palm Plaza, Jewel Box, and Faber Point.

Telok Blangah Hill Park 

It is a 34-hectare park which is a popular place for wedding couples. A series of semi-circular terrace garden located at the top of the park is the Terrace Garden.

Kent Ridge Park 
  
Kent Ridge Park is a 47-hectare public park between the National University of Singapore and the Singapore Science Park. Due to its undisturbed habitat and abundant plant life, it is a popular venue for bird-watchers and eco-tourists.

Trails 
There are 8 trails at Southern Ridges.

Marang Trail 
It extends from Marang Road, just behind the HarbourFront MRT station along the North East and Circle MRT lines to the cable car station at The Jewel Box on Mount Faber. The trail consists of steps and shaded footpaths through secondary forest.

Faber Trail 
Faber Trail is a  trail going through the Mount Faber Park. It ends at the Henderson Waves. At its peak, it offers panoramic views of the southern part of Singapore and the Southern Islands.

Henderson Waves 

Henderson Waves is a  pedestrian bridge. It connects Mount Faber Park and Telok Blangah Hill Park. It was designed by the London-based consortium IJP Architects / AKTII Consulting Civil and Structural Engineers, with RSP Architects Planners and Engineers (PTE) ltd Singapore. Architect George L. Legendre is the designer of the project
The bridge has a wave-form made up of seven undulating curved steel ribs that alternately rise over and under its deck. The curved ribs form alcoves that function as shelters with seats within. Slats of yellow balau wood, an all-weather timber found in Southeast Asia, are used in the decking. The wave-forms are lit with LED lamps at night from 7 pm to 2 am daily. It also was built in 2008 costing £25.5m.

Hilltop Walk 
Hilltop Walk is a  trail which runs through Telok Blangah Hill Park. The trail connects on one end with the Henderson Waves and the other with the Forest Walk leading to Alexandra Arch.

Forest Walk 
Forest Walk is a  walkway that cuts through about  through the secondary forest in Telok Blangah Hill Park and connects to Alexandra Arch. The Forest Walk also connects to the Labrador Nature & Coastal Walk, also leading walkers to the Labrador Park MRT station and Labrador Park.

Alexandra Arch 
Alexandra Arch is an  bridge that features a curved deck and tilted arch like an opened leaf, connecting Alexandra Road, Singapore and Hyderabad Road. It was designed by Buro Happold with LOOK Architects. The Gillman Village, which was a former British military camp in the early 20th century, now houses a mixture of restaurants, pubs and art galleries. Like the Henderson Waves bridge, Alexandra Arch will be lit with colour-changing LED lamps. At the end of the Alexandra Arch, there is a path lined with flowering plants which leads to the HortPark.

Floral Walk & HortPark 

Floral Walk is a  trail which offers a stroll along a path lined with flowering plants.

It forms the gateway to HortPark – the gardening hub. It is a 23-hectare park Southeast Asia's first one stop shop for gardening-related recreational, educational, research and retail activities in a park setting. Some park highlights include themed gardens as well as outdoor display plots showcasing designs and ideas for home gardening.

Canopy Walk 
Canopy Walk is a  trail which links Kent Ridge Park to Reflections at Bukit Chandu – once known as Opium Hill and site of one of the last battles of Singapore in World War II and HortPark. Elevated  at the centre, Canopy Walk goes through secondary forest with groves of Tembusu and dominant trees of the adinandra belukar. It is also filled with rich wildlife that lives there, such as squirrels, sunbirds, doves, lizards and white-crested laughing thrushes.

Ecological Projects

Sembcorp Forests of Giants
Sembcorp Industries has donated $1 million to the Garden City Fund, an NParks charity, to set up an arboretum – a living gallery of giant tree species – for education and research, and to fund green educational programmes to benefit the community. This is part of efforts to enhance biodiversity within urban areas. These trees are native to the rainforests of the region and include some of the world's tallest species. For example, Koompassia excelsa (tualang) and Shorea faguetiana (Damar Siput) have been recorded at heights of 88 m. Accompanying these grand trees are also other emergent species with heights from 50 m to 80 m tall, where the typical mature rainforest canopy reaches.

Topographical contours and features at the Southern Ridges are exploited and designed for an assemblage of large native trees, creating a most impressive sight amidst the ridges of Telok Blangah and Mount Faber. A subsidiary collection of forest trees with large foliage is also planned to be interspersed in between the Sembcorp Forest of Giants collection to serve as interesting visual points.

The Singing Forest
In 2010, NParks planted around 200 trees of 38 native species of Singapore alongside a forest trail near Gillman Village in the Southern Ridges. The trees were planted to provide a variety of shelter and food, via its fruits, to native birds such as hornbills, fruit pigeons and the greater racket-tailed drongo. This was also to attract the native birds to return to the area, which used to nest there, from their current nests in the deep forested areas. The project was sponsored by ST Microelectronics via the Garden City Fund, an NParks charity.

References

External links
 National Parks Board – Southern Ridges (with map)
 National Biodiversity Centre, Singapore
 Southern Ridges Guide
 

Parks in Singapore
Tourist attractions in Singapore
Hills of Singapore